Douglas Steven Coppola Jr. (born May 22, 1984, in Buffalo, New York) and is an American rower. He won a bronze medal in the men's eight at the 2008 Summer Olympics. He is currently the Head Women's coach at Cornell University in Ithaca, NY.

Biography
Steven Coppola was born on May 22, 1984, in Buffalo, New York, a son of Mimi Barnes-Coppola and Douglas Steven Coppola Sr. He attended Canisius High School, where he started rowing in 1998 at West Side Rowing Club's "Learn-to-Row" camp, he then went on to row at Canisius High School, where he won multiple Scholastic National Rowing Championships.  He graduated from Canisius High School in 2002.  He then went on to get his undergraduate degree from Princeton University in Psychology, from which he graduated in 2006.  He also won numerous National and International titles while rowing for Princeton and in 2005 and 2006 he was a member of the Princeton varsity eight that finished second in the Intercollegiate Rowing Association Championships. In the 2008 Summer Olympics in Beijing, China he made his debut at the Olympic Games rowing for the United States, where he and his team took third and a bronze medal in a come from behind finish after trailing the entire race and being in last place at the last 500 meter mark of the 2000 meter race with a final time of 5:25.34 which was less than 2 seconds behind first place Canada.  Coppola is also the first ever athlete from Western New York's West Side Rowing Club to receive an Olympic Medal.

Race results

International Results

National Results

See also
 List of Princeton University Olympians

References

External links
 US Rowing Bio
 US Olympic Bio
 Buffalo News Article on his Bronze Medal
 Athlete bio at 2008 Olympics site
 NBC Olympics Bio

1984 births
Living people
Rowers at the 2008 Summer Olympics
Olympic bronze medalists for the United States in rowing
Rowers from Buffalo, New York
Princeton University alumni
American male rowers
Medalists at the 2008 Summer Olympics
World Rowing Championships medalists for the United States